The 1948 Marshall Thundering Herd football team was an American football team that represented Marshall University in the Ohio Valley Conference (OVC) during the 1948 college football season. In its 11th season under head coach Cam Henderson, the team compiled a 2–7–1 record and was outscored by a total of 243 to 71. Claude Miller and Chuck Fieldson were the team captains.

Schedule

References

Marshall
Marshall Thundering Herd football seasons
Marshall Thundering Herd football